State Highway 163 (SH 163) is a  state highway in the western part of Texas, United States.

Route description
SH 163 runs almost directly north from its originating junction with U.S. Highway 90 at Comstock near the Rio Grande, the southern border of the state. The road passes east of the Seminole Canyon State Historical Park and along the Devils River to the ghost town of Juno. The highway continues north to Ozona at Interstate 10 and to Barnhart, where it junctions with U.S. Highway 67, and on to Sterling City. The highway is co-routed with U.S. Highway 87 at Sterling City, but then diverges after a few miles to continue northward to Colorado City and a final junction with Interstate 20 Business Loop (former U.S. Highway 80).

Counties traversed by the highway include Val Verde, Crockett, Irion, Tom Green, Sterling, and Mitchell. Most of the terrain covered by the highway is sparsely populated ranch country.

History
The original formation of the highway on February 26, 1930 (numbered on March 19, 1930) included only the section from Ozona to Barnhart. On January 18, 1937, SH 163 extended south to Comstock. On September 27, 1957, SH 101 and RM 379 were cancelled and combined into the additional sections of SH 163 from Barnhart to Colorado City.

Major intersections

References

External links
Texas official travel map at the Texas Department of Transportation (enlargement required for legibility)

163
Transportation in Val Verde County, Texas
Transportation in Crockett County, Texas
Transportation in Irion County, Texas
Transportation in Sterling County, Texas
Transportation in Mitchell County, Texas